Siddique may refer to:

Mononym
Siddique (actor), Indian actor
Siddique (director), Indian director and script writer

Given name
Siddique ul-Islam (1970–2007), Bangladeshi terrorist
Siddique Salik (1935–1988), Pakistani general and author
Siddique Umer (born 1982), Pakistani sport shooter

Middle name
Ammar Siddique Khan, Pakistani politician member of the Provincial Assembly of the Punjab
Mian Ghulam Siddique Mekan (1844-1905), Muslim Scholar, Sufi of Qadri order and poet
Ramzan Siddique Bhatti, Pakistani politician and member of the Provincial Assembly of the Punjab

Surname
AAMS Arefin Siddique or Abu Ahsan Mohammad Shamsul Arefin Siddique (born 1953), Bangladeshi academic
Ab Siddique (1927-2012), Bangladeshi politician
Abubakar Siddique (born 1936), Bangladeshi poet, novelist, short story writer and critic
Abubakar Boniface Siddique also Abubakar Saddique Boniface) (born 1960), Ghanaian politician and government minister 
Abdul Kader Siddique, Bangladeshi politician
Amjad Siddique (born 1959), Pakistani cricketer
Arfa Siddique (born 1987), Pakistani politician and Pashtun human rights activist
Baba Siddique, Indian politician and Member of Legislative Assembly (MLA) of the state of Maharashtra in India
Hafiz Muhammad Siddique (1819-1890), a scholar from Sindh and founder of school of thought
Hamza Siddique (born 1991), English cricketer
Hasan Foez Siddique (born 1956), Bangladeshi justice of the Supreme Court of Bangladesh
Islahuddin Siddique (born 1948), also spelled Islah-ud-Din Siddiqui, Pakistani field hockey player
John Siddique (born 1964), British spiritual teacher, poet, and author
Junaid Siddique (born 1987), Bangladeshi cricketer of Pakistani descent
Junaid Siddique (Emirati cricketer), Emirati cricketer
M. Osman Siddique (born 1950), American politician and diplomat
Muhammad Siddique (born 1948), Pakistani middle-distance runner
Nadeem Siddique (born 1977), English professional boxer of Pakistani origin
Palbasha Siddique (born 1991), Bangladeshi born American singer
Rabia Siddique (born 1971), Australian criminal and human rights lawyer
T Siddique (born 1976), Indian politician and current Working president KPCC of Kerala State
Tahir Hussain Siddique, Indian politician, leader of Samajwaadi Party and an ex-member of Uttar Pradesh Legislative Assembly
Tahjib Alam Siddique, Bangladesh politician and Member of Parliament from Jhenaidah
Tarique Siddique (born 1994), Indian cricketer
Tarique Ahmed Siddique, Bangladeshi Army Officer and Defence and Security adviser
Zeeshan Siddique (born 1992), Indian politician from the Indian National Congress

Others
Siddique–Lal, Indian screenwriter and director duo, consisting of Siddique and Lal active together in Malayalam cinema

See also
Sidique, a given name
Siddiqui / Siddiqi
Siddiq (name)
Sadek (disambiguation)
Sadeq (disambiguation)
Sadiq (disambiguation)
Sadegh (disambiguation)